Gorée is an island in Senegal, Africa.

Goree may also refer to:
Goree, Texas, a city in Knox County in the US State of Texas
Goeree-Overflakkee (historically "Goree"), Netherlands
Goree, a 2019 Sinhala film

People with the surname
T. J. Goree, Confederate lieutenant